Miami International University of Art & Design (formerly the International Fine Arts College) is a private, for-profit art school in Miami, Florida. It is owned and operated by the non-profit Education Principle Foundation (aka Colbeck Foundation).  The university is accredited by the Southern Association of Colleges and Schools Commission on Colleges (SACSCOC) and is a member of the Art Institutes system of schools. 

The university has programs in design, media and visual arts, fashion, and culinary arts. Its sister schools are the Art Institutes, a collection of schools once owned by Education Management Corporation (EDMC) and Dream Center Education Holdings (DCEH).

Established in 1965, the university provides career-focused education in the applied arts and design. It is accredited by the Southern Association of Colleges and Schools.

Miami International University of Art & Design has branch campuses in Tampa and Dallas.

Faculty
AI Miami has 11 full-time instructors and 93 part-time instructors for 934 students.

References

External links 
 

The Art Institutes
Educational institutions established in 1965
Private universities and colleges in Florida
Film schools in Florida
Universities and colleges accredited by the Southern Association of Colleges and Schools
Universities and colleges in Miami-Dade County, Florida
Tourist attractions in Miami
Buildings and structures in Miami
Education in Miami
Fashion merchandising
1965 establishments in Florida
Educational institutions disestablished in 2018